Elise Aubert (8 February 1837 – 30 November 1909) was a Norwegian novelist, short-story writer, and non-fiction writer.

Biography
Elise Sofie Aars was born at Lier in Buskerud, Norway. She was the daughter of priest and politician
Nils Fredrik Julius Aars  (1807–65) and Sofie Elisabeth Stabel (1813–86).
She grew up in rectories located in  Alta in Finnmark and Lom in Gudbrandsdalen. She was married to professor and government minister Ludvig Mariboe Benjamin Aubert. Among their children were jurist Vilhelm Mariboe Aubert (1868–1908) and film critic  Sofie Aubert Lindbæk (1875–1953) .
  
During the 1870s, Aubert delivered short-stories, articles and serials to newspapers, signing with the pseudonyms "Tante Dorthe" or "E-e". Some of these were released as the book Fra Hovedstaden i Syttiaarene in 1892. Among her novels are Dagny from 1882 and Bølgeslag from 1886. Aubert published the memoir book Fra de gamle Prestegaarde in 1902. After her death in 1909, a selection of her letters and diaries (Fra Krinoline-Tiden. Elise Auberts Ungdomsbreve og Dagbøker) were first published  in 1921 by her daughter, Sofie Lindbæk.

Selected works
Hjemmefra. Fortællinger for de Unge (1878)
Kirsten. En Fortælling (1880)
Et Juleminde (1881)
Stedbarnet. Fortælling (1889)
Forfængelighed. Fortælling (1890)
Fjeldfolk. To Fortællinger (1893)
Dage som svandt (1903)
Glimt (1904)
Tidens tegn (1906)

References

Other sources
Aubert, Elise  (2012) Fra Krinoline-tiden: Elise Auberts Ungdomsbreve Og Dagbøker (Nabu Press) 

1837 births
1909 deaths
People from Lier, Norway
Norwegian non-fiction writers
Norwegian women non-fiction writers
Norwegian memoirists
Norwegian diarists
Women diarists
Norwegian women novelists
19th-century Norwegian novelists
20th-century Norwegian novelists
20th-century Norwegian women writers
19th-century Norwegian women writers
19th-century Norwegian writers
Burials at the Cemetery of Our Saviour
19th-century memoirists
19th-century diarists